Maggie Bandur is an American television writer and TV series producer.

Biography
In 1992, as a student at El Camino Real High School in Los Angeles, Bandur took part in the United States Academic Decathlon. El Camino Real's team finished fourth.

Bandur was a contestant in the 1994 Jeopardy! College Championship, representing Northwestern University and later was part of the questions in the game.

Bandur is known for her experience in comedy writing. After her first work with Malcolm in the Middle she has written series for Fox, ABC, CBS, the CW and BBC3. With decline of the demand on sitcoms she took various "branching out" jobs, including 6 months in England working on an episode of  Clone. Upon return from England she wrote for My Boys and short comedy plays (Tea & Sorcery, More White Meat). She currently works on NBC's Community.

Filmography
Co-executive producer
Community (1 episode)
Co-executive producer
Love, Inc.
Life on a Stick
Producer (2003) for Malcolm in the Middle.
Writer
Life is Wild (1 episode)
 Big Day (2 episodes)
Love, Inc. (3 episodes)
Malcolm in the Middle (13 episodes)  
Big Wolf on Campus (1 episode)
Life on a Stick (2 episodes)
Clone (episode 6) 
My Boys, (4 episodes)
’’Community’’ (3 episodes)
’’The Michael J. Fox Show’’ (2 episodes)
’’Galavant’’ (Season 2, Episode 4: “Bewitched, Bothered, And Belittled”)
‘’Mary + Jane’’ (2 episodes)
’’Powerless’’ (Season 1, Episode 10: “No Consequence Day”)
’’Deadly Class’’ (Season 1, Episode 6: “Stigmata Martyr”)

References

1974 births
Living people
American television writers
Television producers from California
American women television producers
Jeopardy! contestants
Northwestern University School of Communication alumni
Writers from Los Angeles
American women television writers
El Camino Real High School alumni
Screenwriters from California
21st-century American women